Bruno Siciliano may refer to:
 Bruno Siciliano (footballer)
 Bruno Siciliano (engineer)